The Golden Thirteen were the thirteen African American enlisted men who became the first African American commissioned and warrant officers in the United States Navy.

History
Throughout the history of the United States until the end of World War I, the Navy had enlisted African Americans for general service, but they were barred from joining from 1919 to 1932. From 1893 onwards, African Americans could only join the Navy’s Messman’s and Steward’s branches, which not only segregated African Americans from the rest of the Navy community, but also precluded them from becoming commissioned officers.

In June 1941, President Franklin D. Roosevelt signed the executive order (8802) prohibiting ethnic and racial discrimination by federal agencies or contractors involved in the defense industry.

In April 1942, thanks to protests and pressure from civil rights leaders and the black press, the Navy allowed black men into the general service ratings for the first time.

Responding to pressure from First Lady Eleanor Roosevelt and Assistant Secretary of the Navy Adlai Stevenson, in January 1944, the Navy began an officer training course for 16 African-American enlisted men at Camp Robert Smalls, Recruit Training Center Great Lakes (now known as Great Lakes Naval Training Station), in Illinois.

To ensure their failure, the normal training period of 16 weeks was reduced to 8 weeks for the black cadets. When they realized that someone in the Navy wanted them to wash out, the cadets covered up the windows of their barracks and studied all night. When they were tested, the entire group passed with high marks. Disbelief in the chain of command that an all-black cadet class could achieve higher scores than an all-white one meant that the black sailors had to suffer the indignity of retaking their tests. Again, all 16 passed; the class average at graduation was 3.89.

Although all sixteen members of the class passed the course, only twelve were commissioned in March 1944: Jesse Walter Arbor (1914–2000), Phillip George Barnes (1909-1949), Samuel Edward Barnes (1915-1997), Dalton Louis Baugh Sr. (1912-1985), George Clinton Cooper (1916-2002), Reginald Ernest Goodwin (1907-1974), James Edward Hair (1915–1992), Graham Edward Martin (1919-2006), Dennis Denmark Nelson (1907-1979), John Walter Reagan (1920–1994), Frank Ellis Sublett (1920-2006), and William S. White (1914-2004) were commissioned as Ensigns; Charles Byrd Lear (1916–1946) was appointed as a Warrant Officer. Augustus Alves, J.B. Pinkney, and Lewis "Mummy" Williams also passed the exam but were not given commissions. The reason why only 13 gained rank, despite all the men being successful in training was never explained, but it is noted that this rate brought the pass-rate down to the level of the average class of white candidates. 

Because Navy policy barred blacks them from being assigned to combat ships, the first class of black officers were assigned to command shore logistics units, small tug and tender ships, and training African American enlisted.

Postwar
President Harry S. Truman officially desegregated the U.S. military in 1948. At the time of the Golden Thirteen's commissioning, there were approximately 100,000 African-American men serving in the United States Navy's enlisted ranks.

Of the 13, most separated just after the war as LTJG. Three, Baugh, Nelson, and Reagan, remained until retiring as LCDR. Samuel Barnes became the athletic director at Howard University and served on the executive committee of the NCAA, the first African-American to do so. Dalton Baugh served as an instructor of the Navy Engineering School and later at MIT. Dennis Nelson served as a Public Affair Officer and submitted a report entitled "The Integration of the Negro into the U.S. Navy", which was subsequently published as a book in 1951. William White would go on to serve as the presiding judge of the Cook County Juvenile Court and justice of the Illinois Appellate Court.

Frank E. Sublett, the last living member of the group, died in 2006.

The Golden Thirteen's Legacy
In 1987, the U.S. Navy reunited the seven living members to dedicate a building in their honor at Great Lakes Naval Recruit Training Command, Illinois. Today, Building 1405 at RTC Great Lakes, where recruits first arrive for basic training, is named "The Golden Thirteen" in honor of them.

In 2006, ground was broken on a World War II memorial in North Chicago, Illinois to honor the Golden Thirteen and Dorie Miller.

See also
List of African-American firsts
Wesley A. Brown, first African American graduate of Annapolis (1949).
Samuel L. Gravely Jr., first African American commissioned through the V-12 program (14 Nov 1944), first to attain flag rank (1971).
Harriet Pickens, one of the first two female African American commissioned Navy officers (13 Nov 1944).
Frances Wills, one of the first two female African American women commissioned Navy officers (13 Nov 1944).

References

Further reading

External links
Naval Historical Center photo

African-American United States Navy personnel
United States Navy officers
African Americans in World War II
United States Navy personnel of World War II